The Nardò Ring, originally known as Pista di prova di Nardò della Fiat (Fiat's Nardò test track) when it was built in 1975, is a high speed test track located at more than  north-west of the town of Nardò, Italy, in the southern region of Apulia, in the Province of Lecce. It was acquired by Porsche Engineering in 2012 from its former owners, Prototipo SpA. Porsche now calls the site Nardò Technical Center.

Description
In essence, at the so-called neutral speed which is different for the four lanes, one can drive as if in a straight lane. However extremely fast cars still require the steering wheel to be turned when going faster than the maximum neutral speed. For example the Koenigsegg CCR which set a speed record for a production car at the Nardò Ring did so with the steering wheel at a 30° angle. This speed record has since been beaten by the Bugatti Veyron at Volkswagen Group's private  Ehra-Lessien straight line test track in Germany, and hence the CCR only holds the speed record for the Nardò Ring. In the process of fighting a turn as needed when going faster than the neutral speed quite a bit of potential top speed is lost and hence a fast car will go faster in a straight line than what is possible on the Nardò Ring. Even at the neutral speed, in a banked turn a car runs a bit heavier than it would in a straight line, since the downforce created by the banking increases the rolling resistance on the tires. 

The neutral speed for the four car/motorcycle lanes are respectively:
 Lane 1 – 
 Lane 2 – 
 Lane 3 – 
 Lane 4 – 
Higher speeds are only allowed at times when a client gets the track for its exclusive use.

The plant also includes other tracks; the most important is 6.222 km handling circuit, completely inside the circular one. It is characterized by a long main straight and sixteen curves of different radius and variable lateral slope. It can provide useful results for durability, reliability, vehicle dynamics and tire tests of both cars and motorbikes.

The track was featured in British TV series Top Gear in 1992, showing footage of the Jaguar XJ220, driven by Martin Brundle on a top speed test.  It was again featured in the series 18 opener of the 2002 reboot format of Top Gear, when the then presenters of the show Jeremy Clarkson, Richard Hammond and James May drove in a Lamborghini Aventador, a Noble M600 and a McLaren MP4-12C, respectively, to see who could reach the highest speed. The rough surface of the track figured prominently in the latter episode, and it was resurfaced in 2018.

Records set on the Nardò Ring 

 On May 13, 1979 a 125cc Honda sets the 24-hour average speed world record: 137.866 km/h (85.67 mph) 
On May 5, 1979, a car broke 400 km/h for the first time, the Mercedes-Benz C111-IV reached a speed of 403.978 km/h, establishing the Italian speed record. The car was able to complete a full ring lap in 1 minute and 57 seconds
 In 1980 the Volkswagen ARVW set the speed record for a diesel car reaching a speed of 362.07 km/h
 On November 7, 1982 a Porsche 928 S sets the 24-hour speed record, covering 6,033 kilometers at an average speed of 251.4 km/h (156.2 mph)
On November 28, 1982 an Alfa Romeo Giulietta sets the average speed record over a distance of 50,000 km: 175,628 km/h
 Between 17 and 21 August 1983, three Mercedes-Benz 190E 2.3-16 cars set endurance records for 25,000 km (15,534 miles), 25,000 miles (40,233 km), 50,000 km (31,068 miles), the latter being run in 201 hours, 39 minutes and 43 seconds at an average 247.94 km/h (154.06 mph).
On 14 September 1986, the Elf R prototype motorcycle set six world records, including an average speed of 243.572 km/h over 10 km and a top speed of 321 km/h
On April 4, 1988, an Audi 200 quattro set the world speed record on 500 miles with an average speed of 324.509 km / h and on 1000 km at 326.403 km/h
On 29 August 1993 a Honda NR 750cc ridden by Loris Capirossi set the world record for top speed 304,032 km/h. The record is also established with a standing start on the kilometer at 299.825 km/h and on the 10 km at 283.551 km/h
 In 1993 a Porsche 928 GTS beats the previous record covering in 24 hours 6.377,25 km at an average speed of 265.72 km/h (165.11 mph)
On June 2, 1994, the Violent Violet electric motorcycle designed by engineer Fabio Fazi and driven by Max Biaggi set five world speed records for electric motorcycles: 1/4 mile, kilometer and mile from standstill, kilometer launched (164.498 km/h) and top speed of 168 km/h
 On July 2, 1994 a Bugatti EB110GT set a speed record for a methane-powered car, with road homologation, reaching a speed of 344.7 km/h (214.2 mph)
 In 1994 the Bertone Z.E.R. managed to set the speed record for an electric car on 1 km by driving it at an average speed of 303.977 km/h (188.883 mph) 
On 27 August 1995 an Aprilia 250cc set the record on the kilometer launched with an average speed of 254,021 km/h;
On June 3, 2000, a Suzuki GSX 1300R set the world speed record on the running kilometer with 306.598 km/h;
On February 16, 2002, a production Lamborghini Murciélago set the average speed record over 1 hour at 305,041 km/h and over 100 miles at 320,254 km/h
 On February 23, 2002 a Volkswagen W12 also known as Volkswagen Nardò took the world record for all speed classes over 24 hours covering a distance of 7,740.576 kilometres (4,809.8 mi) at an average speed of 322.891 km/h (200.6 mph)
In 2004, the Eliica electric concept car, featuring 8-wheel drive, reached a speed of 370 km/h
 On February 28, 2005  a Koenigsegg CCR, driven by Loris Bicocchi, set the speed record for a production car at 388 km/h (241 mph)
On 25 May 2008 a Mercedes-Benz Truck Actros BlueTec III sets the efficiency record for a 40-ton truck with an average consumption of 19.44 liters per 100 km with a total distance traveled of 12,728 km
On 18 August 2019, a pre-series model of the electric Porsche Taycan covered the distance of 3425 km in 24 hours
Near the track there is a board showing some of the world records that have been established on the ring.

Loris Bicocchi accident in the Bugatti Veyron prototype 
During one of the first secret speed tests on a Bugatti Veyron prototype, driven by Loris Bicocchi, one of the wheels exploded carrying the fender with it. The fender raised and brought the front hood with it which collapsed and smashed the windshield, causing the car to lose control and slamming into the guard rail at a speed of 398 km/h.

Although the car's brakes failed, Bicocchi managed to slow the car by scraping along the guardrail, escaping with only minor injuries.

Bicocchi received an invoice from the Nardò Technical Center where they said he damaged 1800 meters of guardrail. Bugatti then took charge of the expenditure.

See also
Volkswagen Nardò

References

External links
Official site
"Nardò ring" Satellite picture by Google Maps

Ring
Sports venues in Apulia
Motorsport venues in Italy
Road test tracks
Round buildings